The tora hartebeest, or simply tora (Alcelaphus buselaphus tora), is an extremely endangered antelope, native to Eritrea and Ethiopia.  It has possibly been extirpated from Sudan. One of the most critically endangered large mammals in the world, it is threatened by poaching and habitat loss. Perhaps fewer than 250 individuals remain in the wild and there is no captive population, as little to no action has been taken to preserve them.

References

tora hartebeest
Mammals of Ethiopia
Mammals of Eritrea
Fauna of the Horn of Africa
tora hartebeest
tora hartebeest